Betsi Cadwaladr University Health Board (BCUHB) is the local health board of NHS Wales for the north of Wales. It is the largest health organisation in Wales, providing a full range of primary, community, mental health, and acute hospital services for a population of around 694,000 people across the six principal areas of north Wales (Anglesey, Conwy, Denbighshire, Flintshire, Gwynedd and Wrexham) as well as some parts of Mid Wales, Cheshire and Shropshire. Betsi Cadwaladr University Health Board is the operational name of Betsi Cadwaladr Local Health Board.

The Board is responsible for the operation of three district general hospitals, 22 other acute and community hospitals, and a network of over 90 health centres, clinics, community health team bases, and mental health units. It coordinates the work of 121 GP practices and NHS services provided by North Wales dentists, opticians and pharmacies.

The Board is named after Betsi Cadwaladr, a Welsh nurse born in Bala, Gwynedd in 1789. Towards the end of her life in her mid-60s she worked alongside Florence Nightingale, nursing casualties of the Crimean war.

History
The Betsi Cadwaladr University Health Board combined the North Wales NHS Trust (previously North East Wales NHS Trust and Conwy & Denbighshire NHS Trust), the North West Wales NHS Trust, and the six Local Health Boards of Anglesey, Conwy, Denbighshire, Flintshire, Gwynedd, and Wrexham.

A report in 2013 by the Healthcare Inspectorate Wales and the Wales Audit Office said that leadership at the board was "fundamentally compromised" because the relationship between the chairman and chief executive had broken down. Both subsequently resigned.

The  organisation was placed in special measures in June 2015, following a mental health services report alleging institutional abuse 2012/13, the Tawel Fan unit was closed in December 2014. On 24 November 2020, the Welsh Government announced that the health board would be taken out of special measures with immediate effect.

Hospitals

Current
Abergele Hospital, Abergele
Bryn Beryl Hospital, Pwllheli
Bryn y Neuadd Hospital, Llanfairfechan
Cefni Hospital, Llangefni
Chirk Community Hospital, Chirk
Colwyn Bay Community Hospital, Colwyn Bay
Deeside Community Hospital, Deeside
Denbigh Community Hospital, Denbigh
Dolgellau and Barmouth Hospital, Dolgellau
Glan Clwyd Hospital, Bodelwyddan, Denbighshire
Holywell Community Hospital, Holywell
Llandudno General Hospital, Llandudno
Mold Community Hospital, Mold
Royal Alexandra Hospital, Rhyl
Penley Community Hospital, Penley
Ruthin Community Hospital, Ruthin
Tywyn Hospital, Tywyn
Wrexham Maelor Hospital, Wrexham
Ysbyty Alltwen, Tremadog
Ysbyty Eryri, Caernarfon
Ysbyty Gwynedd, Bangor, Gwynedd
Ysbyty Penrhos Stanley, Holyhead

Former
Conwy Hospital, Conwy
Ffestiniog Memorial Hospital, Blaenau Ffestiniog
H.M. Stanley Hospital, St. Asaph
Llangollen Community Hospital, Llangollen
Minffordd Hospital, Bangor
Ysbyty Bron y Garth, Penrhyndeudraeth

See also
Betsi Cadwaladr

References

External links 

 

 
2009 establishments in Wales
Organisations based in Gwynedd